Khaira (Khehra, Khera) is a Punjabi surname and Jat clan that is not to be confused with Kheirra, also a Jat clan, in Punjab, India & Punjab, Pakistan. The surname is particularly common in the city of Amritsar where majority of the Khairas (Khehras)were settled before the 1947 Partition of India. The majority of Khehras live in Khadur Sahib tehsil of district Tarn Taran in Punjab, India, in villages Odhar, Nagoke, Kotli Saru Khan etc. There are many variations of this surname such as Khara and Khehra. In India, Khehras live in Faridkot, Batala, Kapurthala, Gurdaspur, Jalandhar and Moga etc. in addition to Amritsar. In Punjab, Pakistan Khairas or Khehras live in Harappa (Sahiwal),  (Girote) Khushab, Gojra (Toba Tek Singh), Kharrian (Gujrat), Dajkot (Faisalabad), Rahim Yar Khan and Lahore etc. Khehras of Pakistani Punjab are mostly migrated (being Muslims) in 1947 from Indian Punjab e.g. Khehras of Harappa migrated from Hassan Bhatti near Ferozepur (from Faridkot state of partition time). Kheirras (کھیڑا) live in Multan, Muzaffargarh (Rung pur Kheirra), Girote and other parts of southern Punjab & in some areas of Sindh, Pakistan.

People with the surname
People with surname include:

Japji Khaira, Australian Panjabi actress
Jujhar Khaira (born 1994), Canadian ice hockey player
Nimrat Khaira (active from 2014), Indian Punjabi singer
Sukhpal Singh Khaira (born 1965), Indian politician from Punjab
Ravinder Singh Khaira (born 1986), Indian javelin thrower

Historical references
Notable historical references include: 
 "Mahima" named Sikh of Guru Angad Dev.
 Himachali Rajputs of Jaheer Chand clan. (Jaheer Chand was the son of Tara Chand, the king of Kehloor at the time of Guru Har Gobind).
 Natha Khaira (The headman of village Mirankot) and his son attained martyrdom in defence of Rai Singh (Son of Bhai Mehtab Singh).

References

Surnames